Gérard Mfuranzima (born 31 August 1962 in Mugende in nowadays Karuzi Province), is a Burundian who, from 2011 to 2015, was the Burindian representative for the Association of European Parliamentarians with Africa (AWEPA).

Career
From 1985, Mfuranzima was a journalist at the Burundi National Radio and Television (RTNB), and was twice Director of National Radio (1993–1995 and 2003–2006). He was expected to assist the Minister of Information in communications and public relations between Parliament and Government, and was government Chief of the Cabinet from 2009 to 2010.

He is also known for teaching young journalists in Burundi. He uses his wide experience in journalism and communication, having worked as the local correspondent in Bujumbura for Radio France Internationale and Radio Vatican (1990–1995), and contributor to the Bulletin d'Information Africaine (BIA, "African News Bulletin") and for the Syfia International news agency.

References

1962 births
Living people
Burundian journalists
Burundian politicians
People from Karuzi Province